María Alejandra Barrientos Llopis (4 March 1884 - 8 August 1946) was a Spanish opera singer, a light coloratura soprano.

Biography 

Barrientos was born in Barcelona on 4 March 1884. She received a thorough musical education (piano and violin) at the Municipal Conservatory of Barcelona, before turning to vocal studies with Francisco Bonet. She made her debut at the Teatro Novedades in Barcelona, as Ines in L'Africaine, on March 10, 1898, aged only 15, quickly followed by the role of Marguerite de Valois in Les Huguenots.

She was immediately invited to all the major opera houses of Europe, singing in Italy, Germany, England, France, to great acclaim. It is however in South America, especially at the Teatro Colón in Buenos Aires, that she enjoyed her greatest triumphs. Her career was temporarily interrupted in 1907 by her marriage and the birth of a son, the union did not prove a happy one and she returned to the stage in 1909.

Barrientos made her Metropolitan Opera debut on January 31, 1916, in the title role of Lucia di Lammermoor with Giovanni Martinelli as Edgardo, Pasquale Amato as Enrico, and Gaetano Bavagnoli conducting. She remained committed to that house through 1920 where her other roles included Adina in L'elisir d'amore, Amina in La sonnambula, Elvira in I puritani, Gilda in Rigoletto, Rosina in The Barber of Seville, and the title roles in Lakmé and Mireille. She notably portrayed The Queen of Shemakha in Nikolai Rimsky-Korsakov's The Golden Cockerel for the opera's United States premiere on March 6, 1918. Her Met career came to an end on May 1, 1920 with a tour performance of L'elisir d'amore opposite Enrico Caruso.

Barrientos continued appearing on stage in standard coloratura roles until 1924. She then restricted herself to recitals, and became an admired interpreter of French and Spanish songs.

Barrientos was a singer with a voice of almost instrumental limpidity. She made a valuable set of recordings for Fonotipia Records and Columbia Records.

She retired to the south-west of France, where she became an enthusiastic bridge player.  She died at Ciboure on 8 August 1946.

References

Further reading
 Alain Pâris, Dictionnaire des interprètes et de l'interpretation musicale au XX siècle (2 vols), Éditions Robert Laffont (Bouquins, Paris 1982, 4th Edn. 1995, 5th Edn 2004). 
 D. Hamilton (ed.),The Metropolitan Opera Encyclopedia: A Complete Guide to the World of Opera (Simon and Schuster, New York 1987). 
 Roland Mancini and Jean-Jacques Rouveroux,  (orig. H. Rosenthal and J. Warrack, French edition), Guide de l’opéra, Les indispensables de la musique (Fayard, 1995).

External links 
 Maria Barrientos

1880s births
1946 deaths
Singers from Barcelona
Opera singers from Catalonia
Spanish operatic sopranos
Fonotipia Records artists
20th-century Spanish women opera singers